Zee Picchar is an Indian Kannada movies pay television channel offers Kannada movies. It was launched on 1 March 2020 and it is the sister channel of Zee Kannada. The channel owned by Zee Entertainment Enterprises.

History
Zee Picchar, launch on 1 March in the year 2020 and the first look was unveiled on-air on Zee Kannada on 9 February with a promotional video.

For the first time ever in Karnataka, the channel is set to telecast 12 Picchar Premieres in 12 consecutive days, in its first month of launch and will also telecast a ‘only one break’ movie at 13:00 (IST) every day.

Availability
The channel available across India and other countries through satellite and cable. It is also available through digital and mobile entertainment platform with live on ZEE5.

See also
 Zee Kannada
 List of Kannada-language television channels

References

External links
 Zee Picchar Official website
 ZEE5 official website

Kannada-language television channels
Television stations in Bangalore
Zee Entertainment Enterprises
Television channels and stations established in 2020
2020 establishments in Karnataka
Movie channels in India